Brit Cops is a British reality television series following police officers in the UK. It was originally broadcast on Bravo. Until the closing of Bravo in 2011, older episodes were then shown Channel One (formerly Virgin1) until its closure also in 2011, then Sky1. After the fifth series the show was replaced by Cop Squad. Each series focuses on different UK police forces.

Richard Bacon narrates Series 1, 2 and 3, Simon Allix narrates Series 4, Daniel Abineri narrates Series 5 and Robert Glenister narrates Series 6.

The Show has had the following series:

Brit Cops: Frontline Crime
Series 1: 12 episodes - First shown 18 August 2008. It followed the Q-Cars of the London Metropolitan Police Service, the high speed reactive units cleaning up the capital. In the South West, the Tactical Aid Group are the tough guys of Devon and Cornwall Police (which were later followed by Raw Cut TV's series 7 of Road Wars). Traffic and Armed Response units are also followed in South-West Wales from Dyfed-Powys Police.

Brit Cops: Zero Tolerance
Series 2: 10 episodes - First shown 25 March 2009. It followed Q-Cars, the response team and the burglary squad in Hammersmith & Fulham, London.

Brit Cops: Rapid Response
Series 3: - 10 episodes - First shown 6 January 2010. It followed Wiltshire Police and Dyfed-Powys Police local response officers, alongside Operational Support Groups carrying out raids. Some epodes also featured clips from Traffic Officers policing the roads.

Brit Cops: Law and Disorder
Series 4: 10 episodes - First shown 4 August 2010. It follows City of London Police as they tackle the rising crime rate within London's Square Mile. This is the first set that has the new format. For unknown reasons, this series was narrated by Simon Allix rather than Richard Bacon.

Brit Cops: War on Crime
Series 5: 10 episodes - First shown 28 October 2010. It follows the Lincolnshire Police as they tackle drug related and violent crime. This series was narrated by Daniel Abineri.

See also
 Police Interceptors - series broadcast on Channel 5 with a similar format
 Traffic Cops - similar series following Road Policing Units in the UK, broadcast on Channel 5, Previously BBC One and Repeats broadcast on Really & Dave 
 Sky Cops - series first broadcast on BBC featuring the Metropolitan Police Air Support Unit
 Road Wars - series with a similar format broadcast on Sky1, Sky2 and Pick TV
 Street Wars - programme broadcast on Sky which is more about police officers "on the beat"
 Most Evil Killers - programme broadcast on Pick (TV channel)''

2008 British television series debuts
2010 British television series endings
2000s British crime television series
2000s British reality television series
2010s British crime television series
2010s British reality television series
Bravo (British TV channel) original programming
British crime television series
Documentary television series about policing
Sky UK original programming